Snowpack Park, known in Japan as , is a  life simulation game developed by Skip Ltd. and published by Nintendo for the Wii's WiiWare digital distribution service. It was released in North America on November 22, 2010 and on December 21, 2010 in Japan.

Story
The player has arrived at the Snowpack Park hoping to hang out with some of the local penguins and learn how to take care of them. However, a recent storm has just sent the residents of the park fleeing to various islands throughout the area, and there are only a few penguins to be found. The player sets out to gather back all the penguins at the various islands, and bring them back to the Snowpack Park. They are accompanied by Sam the penguin, who teaches them everything they need to know about caring for the penguins.

Gameplay
Snowpack Park is a slow-paced life simulation game. Players take control over either a Mii character or one of the characters already prepared. The game revolves around gathering penguins and interacting with them by feeding, petting and playing different minigames with them. players brave various terrain and unexpected obstacles as they travel from island to island, finding penguins and bringing them back safely to the park. But getting them back is just the beginning. The penguins have different moods, which go up and down depending on how much interaction they have with the player, and if a penguin's mood gets too bad, it will leave the park. To prevent that from happening, players must learn how to feed, pet, and play games with the penguins in order to keep them happy.

At the end of the day, players receive friend points depending on their friendship with the penguins. These points can be used to buy balloons, that help them travel to new islands where they can gather more penguins. Players can also find new items and items, accessories and headwear they can equip their penguins with. They can also fish at special locations, where they can catch e.g. tuna, blowfish and even more items. There are various minigames players can play around the park, such as Free-Throw Follies, Blowfish Bowling, and Chuck-a-Chowfish. There are also several minigames they can unlock by tracking down keys to igloos located throughout the park. The penguins play an important role in the minigames. An example of this is the basketball minigame, where players throw penguins instead of basketballs.

Reception
Snowpack Park received mixed reviews after its launch. Reviewers criticised the game for being too aimless and shallow, but praised it for having a calm and relaxing mood. NintendoLife.com rewarded the game 6/10 and noted that the game had some good qualities, but was hard to recommend. They also said that it was slow and aimless. TheBitBlock.com was more positive in their and rewarded the game 8/10. They claimed it to be "one of the best experiences they've had on WiiWare".

References

External links
Official webpage
Official webpage 

2010 video games
Life simulation games
Nintendo games
Skip Ltd. games
Video games developed in Japan
Wii-only games
Wii games
WiiWare games
Multiplayer and single-player video games